The Handeni National Forest Reserve (or Handeni Game Controlled Area) is a forest reserve located in Handeni District of Tanga Region in Tanzania. It was established in 1973.

References

Protected areas of Tanzania
Protected areas established in 1974
1974 establishments in Tanzania
Geography of Tanga Region